Van der Aa is a Dutch toponymic surname meaning "from the Aa (river)", of which there are a few dozen in the Low Countries alone.

Those bearing this name include:

Abraham Jacob van der Aa (1792-1857), Dutch author of biographical and geographical dictionaries of the Netherlands
Christianus Carolus Henricus van der Aa (1718–1793), Dutch pastor and secretary of science society
Christianus Robidé van der Aa (1791-1851), Dutch jurist and writer
Cornelis van der Aa (1749-1816), Dutch historian
Dirk van der Aa (1731-1809), Dutch painter
Hubertus Antonius van der Aa (born 1935), Dutch mycologist
Jan III van Gruuthuse en van der Aa (1368–1420), Flemish-Burgundian knight
Michel van der Aa (born 1970), Dutch composer
Petrus van der Aa (1530-1594),  Brabantine jurist
Philips van der Aa (died after 1586), Dutch politician
Pieter van der Aa (1659-1733), Dutch publisher
Sandra van der Aa (born 1972), Dutch athlete

See also
Aa (surname)

Dutch-language surnames
Surnames of Dutch origin